The Jefferson-Eppes Trophy is an American college football trophy given to the winner of irregularly played games between the Florida State Seminoles of Florida State University and the Virginia Cavaliers of the University of Virginia. The trophy was created on the suggestion of former FSU President Sandy D'Alemberte, after Virginia became the first ACC program to defeat Florida State on November 2, 1995. To that point, the Seminoles had run up a perfect 29–0 record through their first 3½ years of Atlantic Coast Conference play.

Virginia and Florida State played each other yearly between 1992 and 2006, but the game never became a major rivalry (e.g., called "one of the lesser known rivalries in college football" by the Orlando Sentinel). The annual game was not preserved by the ACC when its divisional play began, and the Cavaliers and Seminoles began facing off much more rarely. In recent decades the games are sporadic but competitive: since 2005, Virginia is 3–2 against Florida State (as of 2020).

Virginia won the most recent trophy game in 2019, and currently possesses the Jefferson-Eppes Trophy in Charlottesville. Unless they meet in an ACC Championship Game, Florida State and Virginia will not match up on the gridiron again until at least 2024.

Eppes, Trophy, and Statue
This football trophy was created in 1995 by Florida State president Sandy D'Alemberte and was named for former President of the United States and founder of the University of Virginia, Thomas Jefferson, and Jefferson's grandson Francis W. Eppes, a two-time mayor of Tallahassee. In 1856, he presented the offer of a building and funds to the State Assembly of Florida to have the West Florida Seminary located at Tallahassee (now Florida State University).  The Seminary later evolved into FSU. Thomas Jefferson's youngest daughter was Mary Jefferson Eppes, mother of Francis Eppes. Her death, in 1804, prompted Abigail Adams to thaw relations between the Adams and Jefferson families by writing her condolences to Thomas Jefferson. Francis was only three years old when his mother died and had no memory of her.

Seven years after this football trophy was created, an Eppes statue was created and placed as a focal point of the FSU Legacy Walk in 2002. Former Florida State president D'Alemberte also spearheaded this effort. The Eppes statue later became controversial, in 2016, due to Eppes' history of expanding his slave ownership to encompass several working cotton plantations prior to the American Civil War, supporting the Confederacy in various ways, and organizing night watches to catch slaves in the streets of territorial Tallahassee. Despite this history, FSU students voted by a large margin, 72% to 28%, to keep the Eppes statue. The Florida State administration moved its location in 2018.

Construction
The trophy is composed of an intricately wrought silver pitcher presented to the city of Tallahassee, Florida by Eppes in 1842 and set upon a wood base made of remains of the McGuffey Ash, which was once the largest tree on the Grounds of the University of Virginia but suffered a fatal tree disease in 1990. The trophy was designed by Ryan Parker.

Game results

See also  
 List of NCAA college football rivalry games

References 

College football rivalry trophies in the United States
Florida State Seminoles football
Virginia Cavaliers football